Alakozai ( - meaning descendant of Alako in Pashto) is a Pashtun tribe in Afghanistan. Spelling variations include Alakozi, Alakoozi, Alekozai, Alekuzei, Alikozai, Alokozay, Alokozay, Alkozai, Alokzai, Hulakozai, Alecozay, Alikusi, and Alakuzei. They are one of the four tribes of the Zirak tribal confederacy of Durrani Pashtuns.

History

Their eponymous ancestor is claimed to be Alako, son of King Zirak Khan, son of Abdal, son of Tareen.

Distribution
The Alakozai people are found primarily in Helmand, Kandahar, Kabul,  Laghman, Kunar Sarkani District and Herat provinces in Afghanistan, and form the majority of the population in the Sangin District. Jaldak, which is located 110 km northeast of Kandahar, is the original domicile of the Alakozai tribe. The Alakozai people stretch from Farah to Kandahar, and constitute a majority in the Arghandab District of Kandahar. The Arghandab district was given to the Alakozai tribe by King Nadir Shah, who brought down the Safavid empire of Persia with the help of the Alakozai in 1738. Arghandab was referred to by the Greek historians as Arakozia, or the "Land of Arako/Alako".

Notable individuals
 Sadullah Khan Alkozai of Chaghar Matti, Chief of Peshawar, according to the report of the regular settlement of the Peshawar district of the Punjab by Edward George G. Hastings page 115, Publication date 1878, Publisher Printed at the Central Jail Press.
Mullah Naqib (c.1950 – October 11, 2007), famous freedom fighter during the Soviet–Afghan War, politician and peace maker from Kandahar. He was one of the most respected elders of the Alakozai Pashtun tribe in the Kandahar area.
Queen Zarghoona Alakozai (mother of King Ahmad Shah Durrani, founder of the Durrani Empire).
Abdul Ghani Alakozai, governor of Nadirabad and chieftain of the Durrani, under King Nader Shah.
Juma Khan Alakozai, governor of Kashmir (1788–1792). His administration was faced by serious floods, Shia–Sunni riots and rioting by the Bambas. He died of dysentery in 1792.
Abdullah Khan Alakozai, governor of Kashmir (1795–1807, under King Zaman Shah Durrani).
Shah Aghasi Nawab Khan Alkozai, governor of Kashmir (1831–1840)
Yar Mohammad Khan Alakozai (Died June 11, 1851) Minister under King Shahzada Kamran Durrani. Minister-regent at Herat, he served as Vizier of Herat from 1829 to 1842. In Early 1842 he deposed Kamran Shah and ruled Herat until his death on June 11, 1851. He was the son of 'Ata Mohammad Khan Alakozai, vizier of Herat from 1818 to 1829.
Sa'id Mohammad Khan Alakozai, son of Yar Muhammad Khan and ruled Herat from June 11, 1851, to September 1855. Herat was briefly occupied by Iran in the spring of 1852 due to an attempted invasion of the Kandahar Sardars.
'Abd al-Ghani Khan Alakozai (maternal uncle of King Ahmad Shah Durrani), governor of Kandahar during Ahmad Shah Durrani's reign.
Zarghuna Begum Alakozai, wife of Governor Sardar Muhammad Zaman Khan of Jalalabad (1839 to 1842), and daughter of Khalu Khan Alakozai.
Queen Alakozai, stepmother of King Dost Mohammad Khan of Afghanistan, and wife of Sardār Pāyenda Khan, chief of the Barakzai clan.
 Salman Khan's paternal great-grandparents were Alakozai Pashtuns from Afghanistan who immigrated to Indore State, Indore Residency (now in Madhya Pradesh), British India in the mid-1800s; however, Jasim Khan in his biography of the actor states that his ancestors belonged to the Akuzai sub-tribe of the Yusufzai Pashtuns from Malakand in the Swat valley of North-West Frontier Province, British India (present-day Khyber Pakhtunkhwa, Pakistan). His grandfather Abdul Rashid Khan was a Deputy Inspector General of the Indore state who was awarded Diler Jung award of the Holkar times.

See also
Mohammadzai
Barakzai
Popalzai
Achakzai
Sarbans

References

External links
 Alikozai Tribal Dynamics from the Tribal Analysis Center

Durrani Pashtun tribes